Helena Mary Molony (15 January 1883 – 29 January 1967) was a prominent Irish republican, feminist and labour activist. She fought in the 1916 Easter Rising and later became the second woman president of the Irish Trades Union Congress.

Early life
Molony was born at 8 Coles Lane, off Henry Street, in the centre of Dublin, to Michael Molony, a grocer, and Catherine McGrath. Her mother died early in Helena's life. Her father later remarried, but both members of the couple became alcoholics, something which would influence Helena years later.

Inghinidhe na hÉireann
In 1903, inspired by a pro-nationalist speech given by Maud Gonne, Molony joined Inghinidhe na hÉireann (Daughters of Ireland) and began a lifelong commitment to the nationalist cause. In 1908 she became the editor of the organisation's monthly newspaper, Bean na hÉireann (Woman of Ireland). "Bean na hÉireann brought together a nationalist group; Constance Markievicz designed the title page, and wrote the gardening column; Sydney Gifford (under the nom de plume "John Brennan") wrote for the paper and was on its production team; contributors included Eva Gore-Booth, Susan L. Mitchell, and Katharine Tynan, as well as Patrick Pearse, Thomas MacDonagh, AE, Roger Casement, Arthur Griffith and James Stephens. The paper included an eclectic selection of articles – fashion notes (involving Irish materials and Irish-made clothes), a labour column, cookery, politics, fiction, poetry...

Molony was central to the school meals activism of the movement; with Maud Gonne, Marie Perolz and others, she organised the supply of daily school meals to children in impoverished areas, and pressured Dublin Corporation and other bodies to provide proper meals (meat and vegetables, and on Fridays rice and milk) to hungry children in Dublin.

Republicanism and Labour
Molony also had a career as an actress, and was a member of the Abbey Theatre.  However her primary commitment was to her political work. She was a strong political influence, credited with bringing many into the movement, including Constance Markievicz and Dr Kathleen Lynn, who wrote: ‘We used to have long talks and she converted me to the national movement. She was a very clever and attractive girl with a tremendous power of making friends.’

As a labour activist, Molony was a close colleague of Markievicz and of James Connolly, whose secretary she was for a time. In November 1915 Connolly appointed her secretary of the Irish Women Workers' Union, in succession to Delia Larkin.  This union had been formed during the strike at Jacob's Biscuit Factory 1911 and was part of the 1913 Dublin Lock-out. Molony managed the union's shirt factory in Liberty Hall, founded to give employment to the strikers put out of work and blacklisted after the strike. "Not one of them is a penny the better for her part in either fight [the 1916 Rising, where all served, and the strike at Jacob's]," wrote Molony in her statement to the Bureau of Military History. "In such a manner is the real aristocracy of a country born." She was friendly with the family of Thomas MacDonagh and his wife, Muriel, and was the godmother of their daughter Barbara, whose godfather was Patrick Pearse; describing Liberty Hall, where Connolly spent much of his time, she wrote: "Connolly, after hours, could be free for private visitors… Pearse called many times, also Joe Plunkett and Tom MacDonagh. These men were all intimate friends of mine, so it seemed quite natural for me to encourage them to buy socks and ties from us."

In the same account, Molony describes leafletting O'Connell Street – then, on the GPO side, only frequented by British soldiers and their mots: "Misses Elizabeth O'Farrell and Sighle Grennan and myself were spotted by police. We took to our heels, and were chased through Henry Street, Mary Street and right up to the Markets in Capel Street. We got away clear, as we were young and swift, and the police were hampered by long heavy overcoats. On the whole we feared more the soldiers with their canes."

Fianna Éireann, the cadet body of the Irish Volunteers, was founded by Constance Markievicz in Molony's home at 34 Lower Camden Street, Dublin, on 16 August 1909. Markievicz worked closely with Molony and Bulmer Hobson in organising the fledgling Fianna. It was during this period of working together in building the Fianna that Molony and Hobson grew close and became romantically linked. However, the relationship was not to last. Molony confided to a friend in the 1930s that she believed they were to be wed, but that Hobson had 'broken her heart' and left her.

1916 Easter Rising
Molony was a prominent member of Cumann na mBan, a republican women's paramilitary organisation formed in April 1914 as an auxiliary of the Irish Volunteers. Members of Cumann na mBan trained alongside the men of the Irish Volunteers in preparation for the armed rebellion against the English forces in Ireland.

During the 1916 Easter Rising, Molony was one of the Citizen Army soldiers who attacked Dublin Castle. During the defence of City Hall, her commanding officer, Sean Connolly was killed, and Molony was captured and imprisoned until December 1916.

Later life
After the Irish Civil War, Molony became the second female president of the Irish Trades Union Congress. She remained active in the republican cause during the 1930s, particularly with the Women's Prisoner's Defence League and the People's Rights Association.

She retired from public life in 1946, but continued to work for women's labour rights; she died in Dublin on 29 January 1967 following a stroke.

References

External links
Women in the Irish nationalist movement 1900–1916

1883 births
1967 deaths
Trade unionists from Dublin (city)
Irish socialist feminists
Women in war in Ireland
People of the Easter Rising
Cumann na mBan members
Irish Citizen Army members